Michael Manasseri (born February 28, 1974) is an American actor and film director.

Biography
Michael Manasseri is a 2020 Independent Spirit Award winning producer (John Cassavetes Award) for his work on the critically acclaimed comedy Give Me Liberty which premiered at the 2019 Sundance Film Festival and had its European Premiere at the 2019 Director's Fortnight at Cannes. Give Me Liberty also won the Best International Film Award at the 2019 Macau International Film Festival.

The first film Manasseri produced, the romantic comedy Dirty Love, was a 2005 Sundance Film Festival selection. Since then Manasseri has produced numerous independent feature films. Manasseri is the co-director of the 2008 horror-thriller Babysitter Wanted. He co-wrote, directed, produced and starred in the 2013 sci-fi comedy Mosquito Man and directed and produced the 2015 Detroit based family comedy The Pickle Recipe which had its world premiere at the 2016 Santa Barbara International Film Festival.

Manasseri has co-financed, developed and produced film and television content, national commercial campaigns, music videos and documentaries for domestic and international markets through his production entity, Flux Capacitor Studios. Manasseri is also an academic/entrepreneurial partner with Oakland University's Cinema Studies program in Rochester, Michigan.

Prior to his experience behind the camera, Manasseri was a child actor who appeared in the '80s teen comedy License to Drive with Corey Haim, Corey Feldman and Heather Graham. He also appeared on Broadway, shared the stage with entertainment legend Yul Brynner and starred in four television series in Hollywood in the 1990's. Manasseri was one of the stars of the long running TV comedy Weird Science alongside John Asher and Vanessa Angel, which can still be found on various digital platforms online.

References

External links
 

1974 births
Male actors from New York (state)
American male film actors
American male television actors
Living people
People from Poughkeepsie, New York
Film directors from New York (state)
20th-century American male actors
21st-century American male actors